Public School 41, Greenwich Village School, is a public elementary 3K–5 neighborhood catchment school. Founded in 1867, P.S. 41 is located in Greenwich Village in Manhattan, New York City. In 1957, the old PS 41 was torn down and replaced by a new building. On February 11, 1961, the auditorium hosted the folk singer, Doc Watson, an important event in the spread of folk music.

The principal is currently Michelle Amato.

Notable alumni 
Notable alumni include:
Robert De Niro
Sakina Jaffrey, actress
Scarlett Johansson
Max Kellerman
Michael Kimmelman, New York Times critic
Alan Gerson, New York City Council member
Bob Woodruff, American country music singer and songwriter
Mitchell Whitfield, actor, one of the stars of My Cousin Vinny
Adam Horovitz or King Ad-Rock, member of the Beastie Boys
Vin Diesel 
Morena Baccarin
 James Kent (chef), owner of Crown Shy and Saga
Harry Chapin, noted singer/songwriter

References

External links 
PS 41 at NYCDOE website

Public elementary schools in Manhattan
Greenwich Village